BNS Haji Mohsin  is a naval base of the Bangladesh Navy, established after the Bangladesh Liberation War of 1971, and named in honour of Haji Muhammad Mohsin. The base is the principal logistics base of the Bangladesh Navy, and is located in Dhaka Cantonment.

Career
The Haji Mohsin currently serves as logistical and administrative support base to the headquarters of the Bangladesh Navy. About 3000 personnel serve at Haji Mohsin.  Some naval training is also provided here.

See also
List of active ships of the Bangladesh Navy

Bangladesh Navy bases
Shore establishments of the Bangladesh Navy